Maungdaw District is a district of Rakhine State in western Myanmar (Burma). Its capital city is Maungdaw and the population density is about 295 persons per square kilometer. Roughly 91 percent of Maungdaw District's population is Muslim, making it the district with the highest percentage of Muslims in Myanmar. In recent history, many Muslims have fled from this region to Bangladesh. Along with parts of neighbouring Sittwe District, Maungdaw District is also informally referred to as northern Rakhine State.

Townships 
The district contains the following townships:
 Maungdaw Township 
 Buthidaung Township

See also 
 Mayu Frontier District

References 

Districts of Myanmar
Rakhine State
Rohingya-speaking territories